Club Deportivo Apodaca is a Mexican football club based in Apodaca, Nuevo Leon. The club was established on January 5, 2007 and currently plays in the Segunda División de México .

External links
 Club Page
 Club Page www.SegundaDivicion.com  l

Footnotes

Football clubs in Nuevo León
Association football clubs established in 1999
1999 establishments in Mexico